Joseph Sarsfield Glass, C.M. (March 13, 1874 – January 26, 1926) was an American prelate of the Roman Catholic Church. He served as bishop of the Diocese of Salt Lake in Utah from 1915 until his death in 1926.

Biography

Early life 
Glass was born in Bushnell, Illinois, to James and Mary Edith (née Kelly) Glass. After receiving his early education in Sedalia, Missouri, he entered St. Vincent's College at Los Angeles, California, in 1887. He returned to Missouri in 1891 and then enrolled at St. Mary's Seminary in Perryville. From there he joined the Congregation of the Mission, also known as the Lazarists or Vincentians.

Priesthood 
He was ordained to the priesthood by Bishop George Montgomery on August 15, 1897. He then furthered his studies at the College of the Propaganda in Rome, where he earned his Doctor of Divinity in 1899.

Upon his return to the United States, Glass taught dogmatic theology at St. Mary's Seminary until 1900, when he became professor of moral theology and director of the seminarians. In June 1901 he was named president of St. Vincent's College and pastor of St. Vincent's Parish in Los Angeles. During his 10-year-long presidency, he broadened the curriculum to a full university course and made it one of the most prominent educational institutions in Southern California.

Bishop of Salt Lake 
On June 1, 1915, Glass was appointed the second bishop of the Diocese of Salt Lake by Pope Benedict XV. He received his episcopal consecration on August 24, 1915, from Archbishop Edward Hanna, with Bishops Thomas Lillis and Thomas Grace serving as co-consecrators. 

Glass added murals to the Cathedral of the Madeleine in Salt Lake that display distinctly Catholic beliefs; some claimed that he wanted to confront members of the Church of Jesus Christ of Latter-day Saints (LDS Church), but others said he simply "wanted to teach Utah Catholics basic tenets of their faith." Glass once played a poker game with LDS President Heber J. Grant and Elmer Goshen of the First Congregational Church in Salt Lake.

Death and legacy 
Joseph Glass died in Los Angeles on January 26, 1926, at age 51.

References

1874 births
1926 deaths
People from Bushnell, Illinois
Vincentians
Roman Catholic bishops of Salt Lake City
20th-century Roman Catholic bishops in the United States
Loyola Marymount University alumni
Vincentian bishops
Catholics from Illinois
Contributors to the Catholic Encyclopedia